McClellan Creek is a river in Texas.
Named after George B. McClellan, who with his future father-in-law, Randolph B. Marcy, made a survey of the area in 1851–52, looking for a route for the Southern Pacific Railroad.

See also
List of rivers of Texas

References

USGS Hydrologic Unit Map - State of Texas (1974)

Bodies of water of Carson County, Texas
Bodies of water of Gray County, Texas
Rivers of Texas
Tributaries of the Red River of the South